Renowned for Sound is an Australian online magazine that publishes music reviews, articles, and interviews with artists. 

The website was founded on 1 March 2013 by Australian music journalist Brendon Veevers and technical director Robert Lee.

Rating system
Renowned for Sound operates a simple five-star rating system, starting at 1 and allowing for  intervals. Users are not allowed to vote.

References

External links
Official Website
MP3 Juice Music

Music review websites
Australian music websites
Internet properties established in 2013